The 2021 Daytona 500, the 63rd running of the event, was a NASCAR Cup Series race that was held on February 14–15, 2021 at Daytona International Speedway in Daytona Beach, Florida. Contested over 200 laps on the  asphalt superspeedway, it was the first race of the 2021 NASCAR Cup Series season. In one of the biggest surprise upsets in Daytona 500 history, Michael McDowell, driving for Front Row Motorsports, won after Team Penske teammates Joey Logano and Brad Keselowski wrecked battling for the lead on the final lap. McDowell was a 100–1 underdog, making his 358th Cup Series start and driving for a team with only two previous Cup Series victories.

Report
Daytona International Speedway is a race track in Daytona Beach, Florida that is one of six superspeedways, the others being Auto Club Speedway, Pocono Raceway, Indianapolis Motor Speedway, Michigan International Speedway and Talladega Superspeedway.

Background

Daytona International Speedway is one of three superspeedways to hold NASCAR races, the other two being Indianapolis Motor Speedway and Talladega Superspeedway. The track's turns are banked at 31 degrees, while the front stretch, the location of the finish line, is banked at 18 degrees. The race will be the return of multiple retired drivers, such as 2010 winner Jamie McMurray and Derrike Cope, the 1990 winner. The race will also be the debut of drivers Anthony Alfredo, Chase Briscoe, Austin Cindric and Noah Gragson. Although Gragson missed the race due to Crashing in duel 2. The race will also be the debut of many new teams, most notably 23XI Racing.

This is the first Daytona 500 without two-time Daytona 500 winner Jimmie Johnson since 2001.

Entry list
 (W) denotes past 500 winner.
 (R) denotes rookie driver.
 (i) denotes driver who is ineligible for series driver points.

First practice (February 9)
This was the first practice session for a NASCAR Cup Series race in almost a year, the last one being at the 2020 March Phoenix Race.

Qualifying
Electrical problems for Derrike Cope and multiple inspection failures for Noah Gragson kept them from taking a timed lap.

Qualifying results

Bluegreen Vacations Duels

The Bluegreen Vacations Duels are a pair of NASCAR Cup Series races held in conjunction with the Daytona 500 annually in February at Daytona International Speedway. They consist of two races 60 laps and 150 miles (240 km) in length, which serve as heat races that set the lineup for the Daytona 500. The first race sets the lineup for cars that qualified in odd-numbered positions on pole qualifying day, while the second race sets the lineup for cars that qualified in even-numbered positions. The Duels set the lineup for positions 3–38, while positions 39 and 40 are filled by the two "Open" (teams without a charter) cars that set the fastest times in qualifying, but did not lock in a spot in the Duels.

Duel 1

Duel 1 results

Duel 2

Duel 2 results

Starting lineup

Practice (post–Duels)

Second practice (February 13)

Final practice (February 13)
Final practice session scheduled for Saturday was cancelled due to rain.

Race
Alex Bowman started on pole, as the race was under threat from rain and thunderstorms. Derrike Cope cut a tire and hit the wall on lap 3, ironically during the lap 3 tribute to Dale Earnhardt, who cut a tire allowing Cope to win the 500 thirty-one years earlier, to bring out the first caution while causing damage to Bubba Wallace. On lap 14, "The Big One" struck in turn 3 as Aric Almirola and Bowman got turned into the outside wall collecting 16 cars. Two laps later, the race was red-flagged for 5 hours and 40 minutes due to rain and lightning. The race restarted with Kevin Harvick as the leader. Defending winner Denny Hamlin won stages 1 and 2 as Christopher Bell lost a left-rear tire and spun collecting Ricky Stenhouse Jr. and Jamie McMurray in stage 2. The final stage remained caution-free as Hamlin, in contention to win the race for the third consecutive time, pitted from the lead on final pit stops but fell back to 13th as the pack got single file with Joey Logano leading. On the last lap, Brad Keselowski attempted to pass Logano on the backstretch but the two collided, creating a fiery crash sending Keselowski into the catchfence and collecting Kyle Busch, Joey Logano, Bubba Wallace, Austin Cindric, Kyle Larson, Ryan Preece, Ross Chastain and Cole Custer. Michael McDowell, who was third at the time, dodged the final lap crash to win his first career victory under caution as well as earning Front Row Motorsports' third Cup victory.

Stage Results

Stage One
Laps: 65

Stage Two
Laps: 65

Final Stage Results

Stage Three
Laps: 70

Race statistics
 Lead changes: 22 among 13 different drivers
 Cautions/Laps: 7 for 40
 Red flags: 1 for 5 hours, 40 minutes and 29 seconds
 Time of race: 3 hours, 27 minutes and 44 seconds
 Average speed:

Media

Television

Since 2001—with the exception of 2002, 2004 and 2006—the Daytona 500 has been broadcast on Fox in the United States. The booth crew consisted of longtime NASCAR lap-by-lap announcer Mike Joy, three-time Daytona 500 champion Jeff Gordon and Clint Bowyer. Jamie Little, Regan Smith and Vince Welch handled pit road for the television side. 1992 and 1998 Daytona 500 winning crew chief Larry McReynolds provided insight from the Fox Sports studio in Charlotte.

Radio
The race was broadcast on radio by the Motor Racing Network—who has covered the Daytona 500 since 1970—and was simulcast on Sirius XM NASCAR Radio. The booth crew consisted of Alex Hayden, Jeff Striegle and 1989 Cup Series champion Rusty Wallace. Longtime turn announcer Dave Moody was the lead turn announcer, calling the race from atop the Sunoco tower outside the exit of turn 2 when the field raced through turns 1 and 2. Mike Bagley worked the backstretch for the race from a spotter's stand on the inside of the track & Kyle Rickey called the race when the field raced through turns 3 and 4 from the Sunoco tower outside the exit of turn 4. On pit road, MRN was manned by Steve Post and Kim Coon.

Standings after the race

Drivers' Championship standings

Manufacturers' Championship standings

Note: Only the first 16 positions are included for the driver standings.

References

2021 NASCAR Cup Series
2021 in sports in Florida
February 2021 sports events in the United States
NASCAR races at Daytona International Speedway